Mariusz Latkowski (born 2 March 1982) is a Polish bobsledder. He competed in the four man event at the 2006 Winter Olympics.

References

External links
 

1982 births
Living people
Polish male bobsledders
Olympic bobsledders of Poland
Bobsledders at the 2006 Winter Olympics
Sportspeople from Warsaw